Katherine B. Aguon is a Guamanian educator and politician. Aguon is a former Republican senator in the Guam Legislature.

Education 
In 1958, Aguon earned an associate degree in elementary education from the Territorial College of Guam. In 1964, Aguon earned a bachelor's degree in secondary education with a minor in English from the University of Guam. In 1966, Aguon earned a master's degree in secondary education and administration from the University of San Francisco. In 1971, Aguon earned a doctoral degree in curriculum and instruction from University of California, Berkeley. Aguon became the first Chamorro woman to earn a PhD.

Career 
Aguon became a teacher in Guam's public schools. In 1972, Aguon became a director of education, until 1976.

In November 1976, Aguon won the election and became a Republican senator in the Guam Legislature. Aguon served her first term in January 1977 in the 14th Guam Legislature. Aguon was also the first woman vice speaker. In November 1978, as an incumbent, Aguon won the election and served her second term in the 15th Guam Legislature, until January 1979. During Aguon's second term, she was also the vice speaker.

Aguon became an administrator of the Division of Research, Publication and Training at Department of Chamorro Affairs in Guam. In September 2009, Aguon retired from Department of Chamorro Affairs.

Awards 
 2009 Guahan Award. Presented by Acting Governor of Guam Mike Cruz.

References

External links 
 Katherine Guon at guampedia.com
 I Manfayi: Who’s Who in Chamorro History Volume II (Hale'-ta), 1997 at chamorroroots.com
 Katherine B. Aguon at govinfo.gov
 Katherine Bordallo Aguon at amazon.com
 Katherine Bordallo Aguon at goodreads.com
 The official Chamorro-English dictionary Sylvia M. Flores, Katherine Bo ... at openlibrary.org

Guamanian educators
Guamanian Republicans
Guamanian women in politics
Living people
Members of the Legislature of Guam
University of California, Berkeley alumni
University of Guam alumni
Year of birth missing (living people)
21st-century American women